Atriplex vesicaria subsp. variabilis is subspecies of bladder saltbush endemic to Australia.

Description
It grows as an erect shrub up to a metre high. Leaves are oval in shape, with entire margins, ten to 15 millimetres long, and 4 to 6 millimetres wide.

Taxonomy
The species was first published by Geoffrey Parr-Smith in Paul G. Wilson's 1984 treatment of the genus for the Flora of Australia series.

Distribution and habitat
It grows in loam and clay, on coastal dunes and salt lakes; it has a fairly wide distribution, occurring in South Australia, the Northern Territory and Western Australia.

References

vesicaria subsp. variabilis
Endemic flora of Australia
Caryophyllales of Australia
Flora of the Northern Territory
Flora of South Australia
Eudicots of Western Australia
Plant subspecies